The following is a list of churches in South Lakeland district in Cumbria, England.

The following civil parishes have no active churches: Angerton, Blawith and Subberthwaite, Docker, Fawcett Forest, Lambrigg, Mansriggs, Nether Staveley, Preston Richard, Sedgwick, Strickland Roger and Whinfell.

The district has an estimated 147 churches for 104,000 inhabitants, a ratio of one church for every 707 people.

Map of medieval parish churches
For the purposes of this map medieval is taken to be pre-1485. It is of note that Cumbria, unlike most parts of England, saw a sustained programme of church building during the 16th and 17th centuries as the more remote parts of the district were settled.

List

Defunct churches

References 

South Lakeland churches
Churches
 
Churches